The Poiana is a right tributary of the river Someș in Romania. It discharges into the Someș in Gâlgău.

References

Rivers of Romania
Rivers of Sălaj County
Rivers of Maramureș County